Losii Dikho is an Indian politician who was elected to the Manipur Legislative Assembly from Mao in 2012, 2017, and 2022 Manipur Legislative Assembly election, as a member of the Naga People's Front. Losii Dikho is the Legislature Party Leader of Naga People's Front in Manipur Legislative Assembly . He was Minister of PHED, printing and stationery (2017-2022) in N. Biren Singh cabinet.

References

1967 births
Living people
Manipur MLAs 2022–2027
People from Senapati district
Manipur MLAs 2017–2022
Naga People's Front politicians
Manipur MLAs 2012–2017